Pireh or Bireh may refer to:
 Pireh, Faruj
 Pireh, Shirvan